Swarghat is a stopover destination on the Chandigarh-Manali Highway in the Bilaspur district of Himachal Pradesh, Northern India.

General information
Climate:- Mild winters and pleasant summers.
Height:- 1220m.
Time to visit:- Throughout the year.

Getting there
 By Road:- From Chandigarh (through Ropar) it is 90 km away. From Shimla it is 124 km and from Bilaspur 40 km.
 By Rail:- Kiratpur (nearest railhead), it is about  20 km away.
 By Air:- Nearest airport from Swarghat is at Chandigarh.

Attractions
hotel hill top(0 km)
Nalagarh Fort (4.5 km)
Bhimakali temple (6 km)
Naina Devi temple (20 km)
Bhakra (37 km)

See also
 List of National Highways in India

External links
 Himachal Tourism Dep. Co.
 Himachal Tourism Department India

References

Stopovers in Himachal Pradesh
Bilaspur, Himachal Pradesh